Anthony Aouni Tamer (born October 12, 1957) is an American billionaire businessman, and the founder and Co-CEO of H.I.G. Capital, a global private equity and alternative assets investment firm with $48 billion of equity capital under management. He previously held positions at Bain & Company, Hewlett-Packard, and Sprint Corporation. The Forbes magazine lists him as the No. 638 richest person in the world, with a net worth of $4.5 billion as of May 2021.

Education
Tony Tamer earned an MBA degree from Harvard Business School, and a master's degree in electrical engineering from Stanford University. His undergraduate degree is from Rutgers University.

Career
Tamer began his career at Hewlett-Packard and later at Sprint Corporation in a variety of engineering, marketing and manufacturing positions. Tamer then joined Bain & Company in 1986 where he ultimately became a partner until he left the firm in 1993.  At Bain, he developed business unit and operating strategies, implemented productivity improvement initiatives, and led acquisition and divestiture activities for a number of Fortune 500 clients.

In 1993 Tamer co-founded H.I.G. Capital with Sami Mnaymneh. Together, Tamer and Mnaymneh have developed H.I.G. Capital into a global private equity firm with $48 billion of equity capital under management. Based in Miami, and with offices in New York, Boston, Chicago, Dallas, Los Angeles, San Francisco, and Atlanta in the U.S., as well as international affiliate offices in London, Hamburg, Madrid, Milan, Paris, Bogotá, Rio de Janeiro and São Paulo, H.I.G. Capital specializes in providing both debt and equity capital to small and mid-sized companies, utilizing a flexible and operationally focused/value-added approach:
H.I.G.’s equity funds invest in management buyouts, recapitalizations and corporate carve-outs of both profitable as well as underperforming manufacturing and service businesses.
H.I.G.’s debt funds invest in senior, unitranche and junior debt financing to companies across the size spectrum, both on a primary (direct origination) basis, as well as in the secondary markets. H.I.G. is also a leading CLO manager, through its WhiteHorse family of vehicles, and manages a publicly traded BDC, WhiteHorse Finance.
H.I.G.’s real estate funds invest in value-added properties, which can benefit from improved asset management practices.

Since its founding in 1993, H.I.G. has invested in and managed more than 300 companies worldwide. The firm's current portfolio includes more than 100 companies with combined sales in excess of $30 billion.

Philanthropy 
In January 2015, Columbia University announced that Tamer and his wife Sandra made a transformative gift to establish and endow The Tamer Center for Social Enterprise, which expanded the existing Social Enterprise Program at Columbia Business School. The new funding allowed for the launch of a seed investment fund for social ventures, expansion of loan assistance and summer fellowship programs for social enterprise students, and development of the advisory network for Columbia's social entrepreneurs.

Tamer is on the board of The Tamer Center for Social Enterprise at Columbia University and on the Dean's Council of the Harvard Kennedy School. He is a Trustee of the Museum of Modern Art, a Trustee of the Lincoln Center for the Performing Arts, and a member of the Board of the International Rescue Committee (IRC). Tamer also serves on the advisory board of LIFE (Lebanese International Finance Executives). Tamer helped launch and is the Founding Chairman of COOP Careers, a non-profit which provides lower-income and under-represented college graduates with the skills and support to overcome underemployment and gain meaningful careers in the digital economy.

Personal life
Tamer is married and has four daughters. His wife Sandra holds a master's degree in Electrical Engineering and Computer Science from Massachusetts Institute of Technology (MIT), and is on the board of directors of Action Against Hunger, the RMF Foundation, the PAMM Museum, and the Tamer Center for Social Enterprise at Columbia University.

He resides in New York City. He is of Lebanese descent, and the fourth richest man of Lebanese origin, as of 2020.

In 2022, he acquired a 5,400 sq. ft. villa in Saint-Tropez for $81 million. The transfer of the property is effective since November 2022.

References 

Harvard Business School alumni
Living people
Rutgers University alumni
Stanford University School of Engineering alumni
American company founders
American chief executives of financial services companies
Year of birth missing (living people)
American billionaires
Lebanese American
1950s births